Vail is an English surname. Notable people with the surname include: 

Aaron Vail (1796–1878), American diplomat
Alfred Vail (1807–1859), American machinist and inventor
Anna Murray Vail 1863–1955), American botanist and first librarian of the New York Botanical Garden
Aramenta Dianthe Vail (1820–1888), American painter 
Benjamin A. Vail (1844–1924), American jurist and politician
Bob Vail (1881–1942), American baseball pitcher
Calvin Lee Vail (born 1995), American YouTuber known as LeafyIsHere
Charles H. Vail (1866–1924), American Universalist clergyman, Christian socialist, political activist, and writer
Clover Vail (born 1939), Swiss-born American artist
Edwin Arnold Vail (1817–1885), Canadian physician and political figure
Eric Vail (born 1953), Canadian ice hockey player
Fred Vail ( 1903–1914), American sports coach
George Vail (1809–1875), American politician
Harry Vail (died 1928), American rowing coach
Henry Vail (1782–1853), American politician
Ira Vail (1893–1979), Canadian-American race car driver
Louis Vail ( 1894), American football coach
Lester Vail (1899 – 1959), American actor of the stage, screen, and radio 
Melville Vail (1906–1983), Canadian ice hockey player
Mike Vail (born 1951), American baseball player
Myrtle Vail (also as Myrtle Damerel; 1888–1978), American actress and writer
Nathan Russell Vail (1825–1888), American mine operator, landowner, and politician
Jacob G. Vail (1827-1884), American army officer and general after the American Civil War
Patrick Roger Vail (1859-1913), American businessman and politician
Pegeen Vail Guggenheim (1925–1967), Swiss-French painter
Peter Vail (born 1930), American geologist and geophysicist
Pyotr Vail (Пётр Львович Вайль; 1949–2009) Latvian-Russian writer, editor, and radio executive
Rachel Vail (born 1966), American children and young adults genre author
 Raymond Vail, English environmentalist 
Richard B. Vail (1895–1955), American politician
Silas Jones Vail (1818–1883), American hatmaker and hymn composer
Stephen Vail (1780–1864), American rail and metal forge businessman
Theodore Newton Vail (1845–1920), American telephony industrialist
Theresa Vail (born 1990), American beauty pageant contestant ("Miss Kansas" 2013)
Thomas Hubbard Vail (1821–1889), American Episcopalian bishop
Tobi Vail (born 1969), American musician, music critic, and feminist activist; formerly of the band Bikini Kill
William Berrian Vail (1823–1904), Canadian businessman and politician

English-language surnames